The 2008 Richmond Spiders football team represented the University of Richmond during the 2008 NCAA Division I FCS football season. Richmond competed as a member of the Colonial Athletic Association (CAA), and played their home games at the University of Richmond Stadium.

The Spiders were led by first-year head coach Mike London. Richmond finished the regular season with a 9–3 overall record and 6–2 record in conference play. After suffering three defeats, the Spiders secured an at-large berth for the FCS playoffs. At home they defeated , and then on the road, Richmond beat Appalachian State and Northern Iowa to advance to the championship game. In Chattanooga, Richmond defeated Montana, 24–7, to earn the NCAA Division I FCS championship. It was the University of Richmond's first NCAA national title in any sport.

Schedule

References

Richmond
Richmond Spiders football seasons
NCAA Division I Football Champions
Richmond Spiders football